The Serbian men's national tennis team represents Serbia in the Davis Cup and the ATP Cup, both tennis competitions. Since June 2006, the team has played under the name of Serbia, following the split of Yugoslavia.

Serbia won the Davis Cup title for the first and only time in 2010, defeating France with 3:2 in the final as host nation. The team was a runner-up in 2013, when they were defeated by the Czech Republic with 2:3 in the final in Belgrade. The team also had three semifinals Davis Cup appearances (in 2011, 2017, and 2021) and four quarterfinals Davis Cup appearances (in 2012, 2015, 2016, and 2019).In 2020, Serbia won the inaugural ATP Cup.

Current team
The following players are representing Serbia in the 2023 Davis Cup qualifying round.

ATP rankings on 30 January 2023

Recent call-ups

The following players were part of a team in the last five years.

ATP rankings on 30 January 2023

History

Serbia competed in its first Davis Cup as an independent nation in 2007.

Within the Yugoslav Davis Cup team, they reached the semifinals of the World Group in 1988, 1989 and 1991.

They competed as the Serbia and Montenegro Davis Cup team from 2003–2006.

Serbia won the Davis Cup title in 2010.

Serbia is considered as the direct successor of former Davis Cup teams (SCG, YUG), which is important in drawing decisions of home/away ties and choice of ground.

Results under present name Serbia

Head to head 
(by No. of ties)

 vs  Czechoslovakia/Czech Rep. 12 ties 5–7
 vs  11 ties 6–5
 vs  11 ties 3–8
 vs  10 ties 6–4
 vs  9 ties 5–4
 vs  8 ties 5–3
 vs  7 ties 3–4
 vs  6 ties 5–1
 vs / Soviet Union/Russia 6 ties 2–4
 vs  6 ties 1–5
 vs  Germany/West Germany 6 ties 1–5
 vs  5 ties 4–1
 vs  5 ties 4–1
 vs  5 ties 2–3
 vs  4 ties 4–0
 vs  4 ties 3–1
 vs  4 ties 2–2
 vs  4 ties 2–2
 vs  4 ties 2–2
 vs  4 ties 1–3
 vs  3 ties 3–0
 vs  3 ties 3–0
 vs  3 ties 3–0
 vs  3 ties 3–0
 vs  3 ties 2–1
 vs  3 ties 2–1
 vs  3 ties 2–1
 vs  3 ties 2–1
 vs  3 ties 1–2
 vs  3 ties 1–2
 vs  2 ties 2–0
 vs  2 ties 2–0
 vs  2 ties 2–0
 vs  2 ties 2–0
 vs / Rhodesia/Zimbabwe 2 ties 2–0
 vs  2 ties 2–0
 vs  2 ties 2–0
 vs  2 ties 1–1
 vs  2 ties 1–1
 vs  2 ties 1–1
 vs  2 ties 1–1
 vs  2 ties 1–1
 vs  2 ties 1–1
 vs  2 ties 0–2
 vs  1 tie 1–0
 vs  1 tie 1–0
 vs  1 tie 1–0
 vs  Caribbean/West Indies 1 tie 1–0
 vs  1 tie 1–0
 vs  1 tie 1–0
 vs  1 tie 1–0
 vs  1 tie 1–0
 vs  1 tie 1–0
 vs  1 tie 1–0
 vs  1 tie 1–0
 vs  1 tie 0–1
 vs  1 tie 0–1

Captains

Other competitions
In addition to the Davis Cup, the Serbian national team has also achieved success in major tournaments in individual and team categories.

Team competitions

Olympic Games and Universiade medal tables
Here is the list of all Olympics Summer Games medalsHere is the list of all Summer Universiade medals

See also
 Serbia ATP Cup team
 Serbia Billie Jean King Cup team

References

External links

Davis Cup teams
Davis Cup
Davis Cup